Naogaon-5 is a constituency represented in the Jatiya Sangsad (National Parliament) of Bangladesh since 2019 by Nizam Uddin Jalil John of the Awami League.

Boundaries 
The constituency encompasses Naogaon Sadar Upazila.

History 
The constituency was created in 1984 from the Rajshahi-8 constituency when the former Rajshahi District was split into four districts: Nawabganj, Naogaon, Rajshahi, and Natore.

Members of Parliament

Elections

Elections in the 2010s 

Abdul Jalil died in March 2013. Abdul Malek of the Awami League was elected unopposed in May 2013 after the Election Commission disqualified the other five candidates in the
by-election scheduled for later that month.

Elections in the 2000s

Elections in the 1990s

References

External links
 

Parliamentary constituencies in Bangladesh
Naogaon District